Giovanni Pinto (born 19 September 1991) is an Italian footballer. He plays as a left back for  club Monopoli.

Club career
Pinto made his Serie C debut for Monopoli on 20 September 2015 in a game against Messina.

On 3 August 2017, he signed a three-year contract with Parma. On 31 August 2017, he was loaned to Ascoli for the 2017–18 season with an option for purchase.

On 31 January 2019, he joined Pescara on loan.

He successively joined Catania in the summer 2019 transfer window. On 9 April 2022, he was released together with all of his Catania teammates following the club's exclusion from Italian football due to its inability to overcome a number of financial issues.

On 29 September 2022, Pinto returned to Monopoli.

References

External links
 

Living people
1991 births
Sportspeople from the Metropolitan City of Bari
Footballers from Apulia
Association football defenders
Italian footballers
S.S. Monopoli 1966 players
Ascoli Calcio 1898 F.C. players
Parma Calcio 1913 players
Delfino Pescara 1936 players
Catania S.S.D. players
Serie B players
Serie C players
Serie D players